Abdul Ghafoor (born 5 March 1970) is a former Afghan sprinter who competed in the men's 100m competition at the 1996 Summer Olympics. He recorded a 12.20, not enough to qualify for the next round past the heats.

References

1970 births
Afghan male sprinters
Athletes (track and field) at the 1996 Summer Olympics
Olympic athletes of Afghanistan
Living people